This is a list of airlines currently operating in Morocco.

See also
 List of defunct airlines of Morocco
 List of airlines

Morocco
Airlines
Airlines
Morocco